Ludvig Rensfeldt (born January 29, 1992) is a Swedish ice hockey player, currently playing with Djurgårdens IF in the HockeyAllsvenskan (Allsv). He was drafted in the second round, 35th overall by the Chicago Blackhawks as the first Swedish player selected in the 2010 NHL Entry Draft.

Playing career
Rensfeldt recorded his first Elitserien point with Brynäs IF on November 25, 2010 with an assist on a goal by Alexander Sundström.

Rensfeldt played for Sarnia Sting of the Ontario Hockey League (OHL) during the 2011–12 season, scoring 22 goals and 43 points in 58 games. In the OHL playoffs he scored 5 points in 6 games before the Sarnia Sting team was eliminated in the Conference Quarter-finals.

Following the 2018–19 season, having played with Timrå IK in their lone season stint in the SHL, Rensfeldt left the club upon relegation and continued in the SHL in signing a two-year contract with Örebro HK on 27 May 2019.

International play

In the 2010 U18 World Junior Championships, Sweden got a silver medal after losing the finals against the United States. Ludvig finished fourth in the tournament in points, second on his team in points to Brynäs teammate Johan Larsson.

Career statistics

Regular season and playoffs

International

Awards and honors

References

External links

1992 births
Living people
Bofors IK players
Brynäs IF players
Chicago Blackhawks draft picks
Djurgårdens IF Hockey players
Malmö Redhawks players
Örebro HK players
People from Gävle
Rögle BK players
Sarnia Sting players
Swedish ice hockey left wingers
Timrå IK players
Sportspeople from Gävleborg County